was a town located in Ōshima District, Yamaguchi Prefecture, Japan.

As of 2003, the town had an estimated population of 7,072 and a density of 149.55 persons per km2. The total area was 47.29 km2.

On October 1, 2004, Ōshima, along with the towns of Kuka, Tachibana and Tōwa (all from Ōshima District), was merged to create the town of Suō-Ōshima.

External links
 Official website of Suō-Ōshima (in Japanese)

Dissolved municipalities of Yamaguchi Prefecture